The Rondônia bushbird (Clytoctantes atrogularis) is a bird species in the family Thamnophilidae. It is endemic to Brazil.

Males are blackish and females are mainly rufous. The stubby, hefty bill has a distinctively upcurved lower mandible and a straight culmen.

Very little is known about this species. Its natural habitat appears to be denser sections of tropical moist lowland forest.

It was formerly classified as Critically Endangered by the International Union for Conservation of Nature (IUCN). All suitable habitat has been cleared from the locality where it was discovered in 1986, and many feared it was extinct, until it was discovered at another site in south-eastern Amazonas in 2004. Following the initial rediscovery, it has been located at other sites in Amazonas and sites in Rondônia and Mato Grosso.

These sightings combined with an old record near Alta Floresta considered likely but unconfirmed indicate it is more widespread than previously believed. It was consequently suggested that downlisting it to Vulnerable status may be appropriate, and this was done in 2008.

Footnotes

References
 BirdLife International (BLI) (2007): Rondônia Bushbird (Clytoctantes atrogularis): downlist to Vulnerable?. Version of 2007-NOV-29. Retrieved 2008-MAY-23.
 BirdLife International (BLI) (2008): [2008 IUCN Redlist status changes]. Retrieved 2008-MAY-23.

External links
BirdLife Species Factsheet.

Rondônia bushbird
Birds of the Brazilian Amazon
Endemic birds of Brazil
Rondônia bushbird
Taxonomy articles created by Polbot